Aileen Lawlor (Eibhlín Uí Leathlóbhair) née Redmond is the 29th president of the Camogie Association. A former camogie player, referee and official, Lawlor assumed office in March 2012 after defeating Catherine O'Hara of Antrim for the position of president-elect at the 2011 congress in the Wellington Park Hotel in Belfast.

Background and playing career
Aileen was one of the camogie-playing Redmond sisters who all played at high level for Crumlin and Dublin. She won All Ireland Club Championship honours with Crumlin and National League and Leinster medals with Dublin, as well as inter-provincial medals for Leinster. She moved to Westmeath in 1988, became a member of the St. Munna's team in 1990 which won 18 Senior County Championships in 19 years, and won a Leinster championship medal with Westmeath. She has held various positions on the Westmeath County Camogie Board including chairperson, vice-chairperson and treasurer and refereed the All-Ireland Senior final in 2002 and the Junior final in 2004 as well as club, inter-provincial and North American finals.

Development roles
Lawlor has served as a delegate to congress, referees tutor and Leinster League Coordinator, coordinating a league which has grown from 19 teams in its first year, 2007, to 36 teams in 2010. She became a member of the National Referees Committee in 2002, and advocated improvements to refereeing standards, as well as introducing fitness tests ensuring consistent fitness standards of camogie referees and an assessment programme for Inter-County referees.

Personal life
She married Donal Lawlor and has four children; 1 daughter and 3 sons, one of whom is named Colm.

Objectives
One of Lawlor's objectives announced upon her election was to increase the number of female referees at national level.

References

Living people
Camogie referees
Dublin camogie players
Gaelic games players from County Westmeath
Irish nurses
Presidents of the Camogie Association
Year of birth missing (living people)